Calasca-Castiglione is a comune (municipality) in the Province of Verbano-Cusio-Ossola in the Italian region Piedmont, located about  northeast of Turin and about  northwest of Verbania.

Calasca-Castiglione borders the following municipalities: Antrona Schieranco, Bannio Anzino, Borgomezzavalle, Pallanzeno, Piedimulera, Pieve Vergonte, Rimella, Valstrona, Vanzone con San Carlo.

References

Cities and towns in Piedmont